Machnatka-Parcela  is a village in the administrative district of Gmina Błędów, within Grójec County, Masovian Voivodeship, in east-central Poland.

The village has a population of 260.

References

Machnatka-Parcela